Rossana Lombardo (born 9 July 1962) is an Italian former sprinter. She competed in the women's 4 × 400 metres relay at the 1980 Summer Olympics.

References

External links
 

1962 births
Living people
Athletes (track and field) at the 1980 Summer Olympics
Italian female sprinters
Olympic athletes of Italy
People from Formia
Olympic female sprinters
Sportspeople from the Province of Latina
20th-century Italian women
21st-century Italian women